The 2010 ITF Men's Circuit is the 2010 edition of the third tier tour for men's professional tennis. It is organised by the International Tennis Federation and is a tier below the ATP Challenger Tour. During the months of April 2010 and June 2010 over 150 tournaments were played with the majority being played in the month of May.

Key

April

May

June

References

 04-06